Valentina Golubenko (born 29 July 1990) is an Estonian and Croatian chess player holding the FIDE title of Woman Grandmaster (WGM). She was world champion in the girls under 18 category in 2008. Golubenko is the first and only world youth chess champion from Estonia thus far. Although a resident of Estonia, Golubenko plays under the Croatian flag as she is not qualified to represent Estonia owing to her Russian citizenship.

Personal life

Valentina Golubenko was born in Volgograd, Russia to a chess family. Her father, Valery Golubenko is a mathematician and chess player who was champion of Estonia in rapid chess from 1993 to 1995 and a triple winner on board one in the Estonian Team Championships. Valentina's mother, Anastasia Golubenko, was a qualified chess coach with many years of experience, making the finals of the Moscow women's championship in 1986.

Career

Valentina was coached by her parents and won several youth titles. She won the Estonian championship in different age categories: three times for girls under 10 (1998–2000), once for boys under 10 (1999), five for girls under 12 (1998–2002), four for girls under 14 (2001–2004), twice for girls under 16 (2003–2004), and once for girls under 18 (2004). She was also Estonian rapid chess champion six times (for U18 girls in 2001-2005 and for U18 in 2007) and junior team champion for boys (2003) and for girls (2003 and 2004). In six of those tournaments she obtained 100% score by winning all the games. She was awarded the Woman Grandmaster title in Antalya in November 2007, thanks to her results at the Mediterranean Flower WGM Tournament in Rijeka 2006 and at the European Women's Championship 2007 in Dresden, becoming the first ever resident Estonian to receive it.

She took part in the Women's World Chess Championship 2008, where she lost to Viktorija Čmilytė from Lithuania in the first round. In October 2008 Valentina Golubenko won the gold medal at the World Youth Chess Championship in the under 18 girls category by scoring 9 points out of 11, one point ahead of the runner-up. In 2014, she won the Croatian women's championship.

She has played for Croatia in five women's Chess Olympiads between 2008-2016. She also played for Croatia in three European Team Chess Championships between 2007-2011.

Conflict with Estonian Chess Federation

Despite having lived all her life in Estonia, Valentina Golubenko and her parents decided to hold Russian citizenship. Thus, since 2003 she has not been allowed to represent Estonia in the international chess championships, as according to the article 8 of the Sport Act of Estonia only citizens of Estonia and children under age of 18 residing in Estonia and without citizenship of any other country can (as individuals or team members) represent Estonia in international championships, such as World and European championships and Olympic Games. Golubenko's family claims that the decision of the Federation contradicts FIDE's General Rules for participation in FIDE events. Estonia's leading grandmaster Jaan Ehlvest agrees with this opinion. Still the Estonian Chess Federation has not allowed Golubenko to play under the Estonian flag despite open letters to FIDE written by both Golubenko's parents, because of the requirement of citizenship set in the Sport Act. As a solution, the Estonian Chess Federation proposed Golubenko to apply for Estonian citizenship; this proposal was rejected by the Golubenko's family.  As Golubenko was denied to play for Estonia and her strength was not enough for Russia she decided to play under the flag of Croatia, which was allowed by FIDE.

References

External links

Valentina Golubenko chess games at 365Chess.com

1990 births
Living people
Chess woman grandmasters
Russian female chess players
Estonian female chess players
Croatian female chess players
World Youth Chess Champions
Sportspeople from Kohtla-Järve
Estonian people of Russian descent